The 2019 Supersport 300 World Championship season was the third season of the Supersport 300 World Championship of motorcycle racing.

Race calendar and results

Entry list

All entries used Pirelli tyres.

Championship standings
Points

Riders' championship

Bold – Pole positionItalics – Fastest lap

Manufacturers' championship

Notes

References

External links 
Official website

Superbike
Superbike
Supersport 300 World Championship seasons